is a Japanese actress.

Career
Toda has starred in many Japanese television dramas, including Liar Game, Code Blue, Ryusei no Kizuna, and Keizoku 2: SPEC. She has also had supporting roles in many other popular TV dramas, such as Boss, Nobuta wo Produce, Engine, and Gal Circle. In the manga adaptation movie, Death Note, she played the role of Misa Amane.

Personal life
In 2020, Toda married actor Tori Matsuzaka, who co-starred in the 2015 film April Fools.

On 28 November 2022, the agency announced that Toda is pregnant with her first child.

Filmography

TV dramas
 Audrey (NHK, 2000), Takino Yoshioka
 Division 1 (Fuji TV, 2004), Sae Imai
 Engine (Fuji TV, 2005), Harumi Hida
 Calling You (2005)
 Zutto Ai Takatta (Fuji TV, 2005)
 Nobuta wo Produce (NTV, 2005), Mariko Uehara
 The Queen's Classroom Special Part 1 (NTV, 2006), Ai Ikeuchi
 Gal Circle (NTV, 2006), Saki
 Kiseki no Dōbutsuen: Asahiyama Dōbutsuen Monogatari (Fuji TV, 2006), Sawako Izumi
 Mō Hitotsu no Sugar & Spice (Fuji TV, 2006), Minami Inoue
 Tatta Hitotsu no Koi (NTV, 2006), Yūko Motomiya
 Tsubasa no Oreta Tenshitachi 2 Sakura (Fuji TV, 2007), Haruka Saitō
 Kiseki no Dōbutsuen 2007: Asahiyama Dōbutsuen Monogatari (Fuji TV, 2007), Sawako Izumi
 Hana Yori Dango 2 (TBS, 2007), Umi Nakajima
 Liar Game (Fuji TV, 2007), Kanzaki Nao
 Ushi ni Negai o: Love & Farm (Fuji TV, 2007), Kazumi Chiba
 Yukinojo Henge (NHK, 2008), Namiji
 Kiseki no Dōbutsuen 2008: Asahiyama Dōbutsuen Monogatari (Fuji TV, 2008), Sawako Izumi
 Code Blue (Fuji TV, 2008), Mihoko Hiyama
 Arigato, Okan (KTV, 2008)
 Ryūsei no Kizuna (TBS, 2008), Shizuna Ariake
 Code Blue Shinshun SP (Fuji TV, 2009), Mihoko Hiyama
 Boss (Fuji TV, 2009), Mami Kimoto
 Liar Game: Season 2 (Fuji TV, 2009), Kanzaki Nao
 Kiseki no Dōbutsuen 2010: Asahiyama Dōbutsuen Monogatari (Fuji TV, 2010), Sawako Izumi
 Code Blue 2 (Fuji TV, 2010), Mihoko Hiyama
 Unubore Keiji (TBS, 2010), Yūko Hashiba & Yuri Akishima
 Keizoku 2: SPEC  (TBS, 2010), Tōma Saya
 Taisetsu na Koto wa Subete Kimi ga Oshiete Kureta (Fuji TV, 2011), Uemura Natsumi
 Boss 2 (Fuji TV, 2011), Mami Kimoto
 Kagi no Kakatta Heya (Fuji TV, 2012), Aoto Junko
 SPEC: Zero SP (TBS, 2013), Tōma Saya
 Summer Nude (Fuji TV, 2013), Hanao Taniyama
 Hana no Kusari (Fuji TV, 2013), Satsuki Takano
 Umi no Ue no Shinryōjo (Fuji TV, 2013), Hikaru Hatori
 Mitani Kōki Daikūkou 2013 (Wowow, 2013), Yuriko Kurashina
 Yokokuhan: The Pain (Wowow, 2015), Erika Yoshino
 Risk no Kamisama (Fuji TV, 2015), Kaori Kamikari
 Kono Machi no Inochi ni (Wowow, 2016), Aki Hataeda
 Reverse (TBS, 2017), Mihoko Ochi
 Code Blue 3 (Fuji TV, 2017), Mihoko Hiyama
 Gakeppuchi Hotel (NTV, 2018), Sakurai Sana
 Scarlet (NHK, 2019–20)
 Police in a Pod (NTV, 2021), Seiko Fuji

Films
 Death Note (2006) as Misa Amane
 Death Note 2: The Last Name (2006) as Misa Amane
 Tengoku wa Matte Kureru (2007) as Minako Ueno
 Ten Nights of Dream (2007) as Mikiko Yagi
 Arthur and the Minimoys (2007) as The Princess Selenia
 Uni Senbei (2007) as Haduki Matsushita
 L: Change the World (2008) as Misa Amane (Cameo Appearance)
 Tea Fight (2008) as Mikiko
 Koikyokusei (2009) as Kashiwagi Natsuki
 Goemon (2009) as Tayū Yūgiri
 Amalfi: Megami No 50-Byou (2009) as Kanae Adachi
 Shizumanu Taiyo (2009) as Junko Onchi
 Ōarai ni mo Hoshi wa Furu Nari (2009) as Eriko
 Liar Game: The Final Stage (2010) as Nao Kanzaki
 Hankyū Densha (2011) as Misa
 Andalucia: Revenge of the Goddess (2011) as Kanae Adachi
 Dog×Police (2011) as Natsuki Mizuno
 SPEC: Ten (2012) as Tōma Saya
 SPEC: Close (2013) as Tōma Saya
 April Fools (2015) as Ayumi Nitta
 Kakekomi (2015) as Jogo
 Yokokuhan (2015) as Erika Yoshino
 The Emperor in August (2015) as Reiko (special appearance)
 Death Note: Light Up the New World (2016) as Misa Amane
 Blade of the Immortal (2017) as Makie Otono-Tachibanau 
 The Day's Organ (2019)
 Almost a Miracle (2019) as Aoi Yoshitaka
 The First Supper (2019)
 Motherhood (2022) as Rumiko

Music videos
Naohito Fujiki "Hey! Friends"
Yurika Oyama "Sayonara", "Haruiro"
May "Sarai no Kaze"
Funky Monkey Babys "Mō Kimi ga Inai"
Mika Nakashima "Orion"

Voice acting
 Genji: Days of the Blade as Shizuka Gozen (PS3)
 Arthur and the Minimoys as Princess Selenia

Gravure films
 Sweet (first release date 2002-12-25, limited edition 2005-09-30)
 Note (FDGD-0158, release date 2007-05-25)

Documentaries
 NHK BS Premium: Artist Document: Scandal (2012) (narrator)

Awards
2007
 Oricon Survey "Fresh Star Ranking" : 7th Place for Female
 Oricon Survey "Most Prominent 18-year-old" : 3rd Place for Female
 Nikkan Sports "Which actress would you want as the heroine of a mobile novel?"

2008
 Oricon Survey "Beautiful skin" : 7th Place

2009
 Elan d'or Awards: Newcomer of the Year
 59th Television Drama Academy Awards: Best Supporting Actress - Ryūsei no Kizuna
 2nd Tokyo Drama Awards: Best Supporting Actress for Ryūsei no Kizuna

2011
 67th Television Drama Academy Awards: Best Actress for Keizoku 2: SPEC

2012
 73rd Television Drama Academy Awards: Best Supporting Actress - Kagi no Kakatta Heya

2013
 16th Nikkan Sports Drama Grand Prix (Spring 2012): Best Supporting Actress for Kagi no Kakatta Heya

2020
 23rd Nikkan Sports Drama Grand Prix: Best Actress for Scarlet

Bibliography

Magazines
 Myojo (Shueisha), The December 2006 issue, "Best Friends: Dare mo Shiranakatta Toda Erika Monogatari"

Photobooks
 Sanwa Mook Naisho na Jumon (Sanwa Publishing, January 2002) 
 Hajimete Kimi to Deatta Natsuyasumi. (Saibunkan, November 2002) 
 nature (Bunka Publishing, August 2003) 
 Sanwa Mook Umareta Izumi (Sanwa Publishing, August 2004) 
 Sei Kore Ism 3 (Shueisha, October 2004) 
 Erika x Cecil McBee Vivace (Shueisha, April 2009) 
 Iqueen Vol.7 (Parco Entertainment, March 2012)

References

External links
Erika Toda at FLaMme 

Erika Toda at JDorama

1988 births
Living people
Japanese child actresses
21st-century Japanese actresses
Japanese film actresses
Japanese television actresses
Japanese idols
Japanese female models
Japanese television personalities
People from Kobe
Asadora lead actors
Horikoshi High School alumni